Couratari prancei is a species of woody plant in the family Lecythidaceae. It is found in Brazil and Peru. It is threatened by habitat loss.

References

prancei
Flora of Brazil
Flora of Peru
Critically endangered plants
Taxonomy articles created by Polbot